Emrānī (or Imrānī; 1454–1536) was a Judæo-Persian poet, being "one of the most prominent Jewish poets of Iran". Emrānī was inspired by the earlier poet Shāhīn to choose "as his field the post-Mosaic era from Joshua to the period of David and Solomon".

His major work, Fatḥ-Nameh ("The Book of the Conquest," begun in 1474, unfinished), describes in poetry "the events of the biblical books of Joshua, Ruth, and Samuel". Emrānī's last great work, Ganj-Nameh ("The Book of the Treasures"), is  "a free poetic paraphrase of and commentary on the mishnaic treatise Avot".

Major works
 Fatḥ-Nameh ("The Book of the Conquest," begun in 1474, unfinished)
 Ganj-Nameh ("The Book of the Treasures", completed in 1536)

References

1454 births
1536 deaths
Jewish poets
16th-century Persian-language poets
15th-century Persian-language poets
15th-century Jews
16th-century Jews
Medieval Persian Jews
16th-century people of Safavid Iran
Iranian Jews